You Guys Kill Me is a studio album by Matt Elliott, released under the moniker The Third Eye Foundation. It was originally released on Domino Recording Company on 20 October 1998.

Critical reception

Will Hermes of Entertainment Weekly gave the album a grade of "A−," calling it "a dense weave of scissored rhythms and slithering tape loops that reads like a soundtrack to some great lost surrealist film." John Bush of AllMusic gave the album 4.5 stars out of 5, saying, "The beats and effects Matt Elliott concocted aren't incredibly original (there's the sewing-machine Brazilian bossa shuffle and the downbeat from Boogie Down Productions' "Bridge Is Over," along with various effects including howling dogs, dark crackly strings and metallic), but the slice-and-dice production, along with creative processing, transforms them into revelatory darkside symphonies."

NME named it the 36th best album of 1998.

Track listing

References

External links
 

1998 albums
Matt Elliott (musician) albums
Domino Recording Company albums
Merge Records albums